John Duke may refer to:

John Woods Duke (1899–1984), composer
John Heath (later John Duke) (1717–1775), MP
Sir John Duke, 2nd Baronet (1632–1705), English politician
John Duke, of the Duke baronets
John Duke (cricketer) (1830–1890), English cricketer
Sir John Duke (police officer) (1926–1989), British police officer

See also

Duke (surname)